Moses Brown (September 23, 1738 – September 6, 1836) was an American abolitionist and industrialist from New England, who funded the design and construction of some of the first factory houses for spinning machines during the American industrial revolution, including Slater Mill.

Early life
Moses Brown was born in Providence, Rhode Island on September 23, 1738, the son of James Brown II and Hope Power Brown. He was the grandson of Baptist minister James Brown (1666–1732), and his father was a prosperous merchant. The family firm was active in distilling rum, owned an iron furnace, and took part in a wide variety of merchant activities including sponsoring the ill-fated and notorious voyage of the slave ship Sally in 1764. Moses Brown's father died in 1739, and Moses was raised in the family of his uncle Obadiah Brown, who was primarily responsible for running the firm's spermaceti works. Following Obadiah's death in 1762, Moses served as executor of his estate. Shares in the farming and shipping business were divided between Moses and his three brothers, Nicholas, Joseph, and John, and the business was renamed as Nicholas Brown & Co. The brothers were co-founders of the College in the English Colony of Rhode Island and Providence Plantations, later renamed Brown University after Nicholas's son. The family was active in the Baptist community of Providence and were descendants of Chad Brown (c. 1600 – 1650), a Baptist minister who co-founded Providence with Roger Williams. Moses had a sister, Mary.

Brown's brother-in-law and business partner, Jabez Bowen was a notable Rhode Island political figure. Moses Brown eventually differentiated himself from his family by converting to Quakerism.

A chest of drawers belonging to Brown currently resides in a Private Collection. it was likely made in Providence, Rhode Island.

Moses Brown married his cousin Anna Brown (daughter of his uncle Obadiah) in 1764. They had two surviving children: Sarah (1764–1794, married William Almy) and Obadiah (1771–1822), as well as a daughter who died young. Moses also served as a deputy to the Rhode Island General Assembly from 1764 to 1771, and he served on a committee to oppose the Stamp Act in 1765. In 1769, he participated in efforts to move the College in the English Colony of Rhode Island and Providence Plantations to Providence from Warren, Rhode Island. The four Brown brothers donated family land passed down from Chad Brown for the new campus.

Brown's wife Anna died in 1773. He gradually retired from the family business and began his involvement with Quaker meetings. The following year, under the influence of his children's tutor, Job Scott, he formally became a member of the Society of Friends.

American Revolution
Following their brother John Brown's arrest in with the Gaspee affair that helped trigger the American Revolutionary War, Moses and Joseph Brown delivered to the English in Boston a proposal that Rhode Island's preparations to resist royal authority be stopped if John Brown was released.

Later life

In 1779, Brown married his second wife, Mary Olney, a fellow Quaker. They were married for 18 years, and had no children.

In 1788, Brown returned briefly to the business world, embarking on a textile venture in partnership with his cousin Smith Brown and his future son-in-law William Almy. Moses Brown became interested in recent British attempts to use water power in their textile mills, and hired English emigrant Samuel Slater to help build a similar mill in Pawtucket, Rhode Island. In 1790, the factory became the first water-powered spinning mill in America, a seminal event generally considered the birth of the American Industrial Revolution. Moses' son Obadiah Brown soon replaced Smith Brown as a partner, and Samuel Slater was taken in as well, to create the new firm of Almy, Brown & Slater. Moses Brown soon withdrew from active involvement in the firm, but remained a partner.

After getting Almy, Brown & Slater off the ground, Moses Brown moved on to a variety of new activities. He played a role in Rhode Island's ratification of the U.S. Constitution in 1790. He also became interested in agricultural experiments on his Providence farm, and helped found the Rhode Island Agricultural Society in 1800. He served on the first board of directors of the Providence Bank, and was treasurer of the Central Bridge Company. Along with his son Obadiah, he was a founder of the Rhode Island Bible Society. During the yellow fever epidemic of 1797, he was a strong advocate of sanitation practices. He later introduced smallpox vaccination to Rhode Island.

Brown's second wife Mary died in 1798, and he married his third and final wife, the widow Phebe (Waterman) Lockwood, in 1799. She had several grown children of her own: Sarah (1773–1832, married E. Bates Harris), Avis (1774–1831, never married), Benoni (1777–1852) and Phebe (1778–1800). After the death of his third wife in 1809, Moses remained unmarried for the last 27 years of his life.

Brown, a pacifist, was inspired by the War of 1812 to work on behalf of peace, and was instrumental in the founding of the Rhode Island Peace Society in 1818. He adhered to and promoted the orthodox Quaker position that Quakers should resist war taxes.

Another one of his interests was local history. Brown played an important role in collecting documents relating to colonial Rhode Island, many of them inherited through his own family. He collected biographical information about his contemporary and fellow abolitionist, the evangelist known as the Public Universal Friend. He was a founding member of the Rhode Island Historical Society, served as its chairman, and had most of his papers left there after his death. Brown was also elected a member of the American Antiquarian Society in 1815.

Moses Brown died from gastroenteritis in Providence on September 6, 1836. He left few family members, having outlived three wives, all three of his children, and three of his four stepchildren. At his death, his only descendants were his granddaughter Anna (Almy) Jenkins (1790–1849) and her children. He also left much of his estate to the children of his stepdaughter Sarah (Lockwood) Harris (1773–1832), and to the Society of Friends. His son Obadiah had married, but left no children. Brown is buried in the Quaker section of the North Burial Ground at 5 Branch Avenue, Providence, RI.

Abolitionist activity
Following the financial failure and human tragedy of his and his brothers' role in the slave trade, Moses broke with his brothers and refused to continue his business sponsorship of it. Later, after becoming a Quaker, he began a long crusade against slavery, and soon became Rhode Island's leading opponent of the slave trade. In 1773, nine years after the voyage of the Sally, he freed the last of his own slaves. During the war, he solidified his opposition to slavery in the company of ministers and teachers from the College, which had ceased business temporarily because British troops were billeted in its campus. At the end of hostilities, Brown renewed his efforts against the slave trade. He unsuccessfully petitioned the General Assembly in 1783, wrote frequently in the local press, and helped distribute antislavery pamphlets throughout New England. He was instrumental in the 1787 passage of a law banning the participation of Rhode Islanders in the slave trade. In 1789, he helped found the Providence Society for Abolishing the Slave Trade with both Quaker and non-Quaker associates to help enforce recently passed anti-slave trade legislation. He later helped engineer passage of a law in the U.S. Congress to forbid foreign slave ships from being equipped in American ports. He also became known for his willingness to help slaves and free blacks on an individual basis, through financial and legal assistance.

In contrast, his brother John was one of the state's leading slave traders and the first person prosecuted under the federal laws prohibiting slave importation.

Moses Brown School

One of his last great contributions to Rhode Island life was his role in the revival of the New England Yearly Meeting School. It had existed intermittently in the 1770s and 1780s, but died out through lack of interest. In 1814, Brown presented the Yearly Meeting with 43 acres of land in Providence, and worked diligently toward the creation of a school on this land. He provided important financial assistance, and also donated his impressive book collection to the school library. His son Obadiah joined him as a major supporter of this effort until his untimely death in 1822. Moses Brown served as the school's treasurer until shortly before his own death in 1836, at the age of 98. The school was renamed in his honor in 1913 as the Moses Brown School, and remains a leading preparatory school in the U.S.

See also

 Brown Square
 Brown Square House
 Moses Brown School

References

Further reading
 Rhode Island Historical Society Moses Brown Papers
 Moses Brown School History
 Charles Rappleye, Sons of Providence: The Brown Brothers, the Slave Trade, and the American Revolution (Simon & Schuster, New York: 2006)
 
 Encyclopedia Brunoniana
 Brown University Charter
 John and Moses Brown reviewed in the Providence Journal with portraits of both
  Hidden in Plain Sight: Slavery and Justice in Rhode Island - an address by Brown President Ruth J. Simmons at St. John's College, Cambridge University on the occasion of the bicentenary of the Act of Parliament abolishing the British slave trade
 Report of the Brown University Steering Committee on Slavery and Justice

External links
 Emlen Family Papers from Swarthmore College Peace Collection

1738 births
1836 deaths
18th-century American inventors
American abolitionists
American Christian pacifists
American manufacturing businesspeople
American Quakers
American slave owners
American slave traders
American tax resisters
Moses Brown
Brown University people
Converts to Quakerism
History of religion in the United States
Members of the American Antiquarian Society
People of colonial Rhode Island
Quaker abolitionists
Quaker slave owners
University and college founders
Inventors from Rhode Island